Karl Holter (June 30, 1885 – June 7, 1963) was a Norwegian actor, writer, and Waffen--SS soldier.

Holter was born in Kristiania (now Oslo), Norway. He debuted in 1912 at the Central Theater and after that was mainly engaged with the Norwegian Theater until 1935. He was also a journalist for the newspaper Stavanger Aftenblad from 1917 to 1920.

Literary activity
In 1936, at age 51, Holter won the Norwegian part of an international novel competition with the story Skinnbrevet (The Parchment Letter). This was also his debut as a writer.

In 1941, Holter became a member of Nasjonal Samling. The same year, he directed Henrik Ibsen's Ghosts for NRK's Radio Theater. In 1942 he volunteered for active front duty. After a short period of officer training, at age 57 Holter was sent to the Leningrad Front from October 1942 to March 1943 as a war correspondent.

Holter was considered a prominent author in Nasjonal Samling circles, and he became one of Gyldendal's most published authors while the publisher was led by Tore Hamsun.

After the war, Holter was convicted of treason and sentenced to three years and three months of forced labor and limited loss of rights. After serving his sentence, Holter did not return as an actor, but he continued to write and published five books. Among these was Frontkjempere (Front-Line Soldiers, 1951), a description of experiences at the Leningrad Front.

Bibliography
 1936: Skinnbrevet
 1940: Kleivdøler
 1944: I veideskog: Jaktminner
 1948: Bliss 
 1951: Frontkjempere
 1953: Terkel
 1956: Gode makter

Filmography
 1926: Baldevins bryllup as a butcher
 1939: Mot nya tider as Henrik Thygesen
 1939: Valfångare as the captain of Kosmos II
 1940: Bastard as Iwan, a farmer
 1941: Gullfjellet as Hans Benningstad
 1942: Trysil-Knut as Ole Kynsberg

References

1885 births
1963 deaths
Norwegian novelists
Norwegian male stage actors
Norwegian male film actors
Norwegian male silent film actors
20th-century Norwegian male actors
Norwegian military personnel of World War II
Members of Nasjonal Samling
Male actors from Oslo